SuperVia Trens Urbanos (English: SuperVia Urban Trains) is a rapid transit and commuter rail company operator, founded in Rio de Janeiro (Brazil) in November 1998. It carries around 750,000 passengers a day on a railroad network comprising 104 stations in 12 cities: Rio de Janeiro, Duque de Caxias, Guapimirim, Nova Iguaçu, Nilópolis, Mesquita, Queimados, São João de Meriti, Belford Roxo, Japeri, Paracambi and Magé.

The baggage areas of SuperVia trains were an adaptation of the original design to fit the Brazilian reality. A Brazilian study found that the average passenger carries a weight of 7 kg in backpacks, shopping bags or briefcases on their daily commute.

History

In 1998, a concession agreement commenced, which established the concessionaire's investment commitments (SuperVia) and grantor (State). Thus, it was possible to realise savings for the state coffers of more than US$1.6 billion, a figure corresponding to the subsidies that the state failed to spend with the operation of the system in the period 1998/2009.

Since the turn of the century, the number of passengers carried has increased and the system has seen significant improvement in compliance with the scheduling of trains, which are monitored on an ongoing basis by the government, through the regulatory agency.

In 1998, before the grant, 145,000 passengers were transported per day, with a punctuality of less than 30%. In 2009, over 510,000 passengers were transported per day, with an average punctuality of 90%, the highest rate ever recorded in the history of the system.

Modernization

With the arrival of 30 new trains in 2011, 14 previous SuperVia train configurations will be withdrawn from circulation. Capable of carrying 1,300 passengers, the new trains have several technical advantages, such as: alternating current traction motors, air conditioning with automatic temperature control, automatic coupling system, door system with detection of obstruction, electronic billboards and onboard displays, sound equipment, security cameras, lubrication system friezes, intercom and emergency signaling devices in accordance with the accessibility standard (NBR 14021).

Trains will also have cameras on the sides (mirror type), which allows monitoring by the driver of any platform without having to move away from the command post in the cabin.
The color blue will be used (which is the color of the state and also a color of SuperVia). Made of fiber, the seats have a padded backrest in synthetic fabric. There are eight seats of a different color on each car and in the engine cars, there are special spaces for wheelchair users. And centers located in the fore sections of the cars, serves to transmit information to passengers. Four cameras will be installed in each car, allowing the driver to have visual surveillance of any emergency request. Four LCD televisions will be installed, with the goal of enabling business partnerships and educational and government institutions.

In July 2021, the company announced that some trains will have free internet connection, the trains that have the service are 3000 Series, with 8 cars and air conditioning, and will circulate through different branches, the service is available in 3 trains only. The network will be available for a year, thanks to a partnership with Eletromídia and Magazine Luiza. To access the internet, the customer who is in one of these compositions, identified with Magazine Luiza stickers, the access to the web will be free for 30 minutes, which are automatically renewed without the need for a new login, for another 30 minutes.

Lines

Special Services

Planned

Aerial tramway/cable car of the "Complexo do Alemão" favela 

On 8 July 2011, SuperVia began operating the "Complexo do Alemão" slum cable car, the first mass transit aerial lift passenger system in Brazil. The cable car is integrated into the urban rail transport system and has six stations - "Bonsucesso", "Adeus", "Baiana", "Alemão", "Itararé/Alvorada" and "Palmeiras". The system consists of 152 gondolas, each of which can carry 10 passengers, eight seated and two standing, and is 3.5 km in length.

From the first station (Bonsucesso) to last (Palmeiras) takes 16 minutes. According to the law signed by Governor Sérgio Cabral, each resident is entitled to two free tickets per day (one-way and one back). The unit rate will cost R$1. The value did not increase for residents, at first.

A month after the end of the 2016 Olympics, the Alemão Cable Car closed for a six-month maintenance period - and it has never returned. Inaugurated in July 2011 with the presence of then-president Dilma Rousseff, the  cable project in the complex of 17 communities in the north of Rio has been out of action for almost five years and has no expected return.

An investigation from CADE, reported that the construction company Odebrecht received from the state, in total  for the housing, health, education, sports and transport interventions in the Complexo do Alemão.

As of 2021, the Governor of Rio de Janeiro, Cláudio Castro, closed an agreement to reactivate the cable car. Castro and Government Secretaries met in France with the company Poma, which implemented the transport system. The 3.6 km route, cost , and suffered depredation and many parts were stolen since its deactivation in October 2016, without working for half that time, in one of the poorest areas of Rio.

Pandemic and continuous operational trouble 
In 2010 then-governor Sérgio Cabral renewed the concession until 2048, without a bidding process, despite the inefficiency in managing metropolitan trains.

In 2013, SuperVia received  to purchase new trains, and invest in the improvement of the metropolitan train system. BNDES released ,  from the state government and the rest of the company's cash. It is one of the most expensive tickets in the country, even without any improvement in the system. Of the current 201 trains, only 75% are new.

An investigation by the Extra RJ newspaper found that a train derailed every 2 months, between January 2017 and August 2019. In addition, the company has several convictions for failure to comply with the obligations established in the contract.

Before the pandemic, the concessionaire transported around 600,000 passengers daily. SuperVia claims that the daily flow has stabilized at 300,000 passengers and has estimated that it needs a daily average of 450,000 passengers to cover operating costs.

Even so, throughout the period of the pandemic, passengers complained about the capacity and lack of conditions. On May 28, a train on the Belford Roxo branch caught fire on the stretch between Del Castilho and Pilares stations. According to the Fire Department, 3 people were injured during the disembarkation, made in haste, between the tracks. A firefighter reported that a composition's extinguisher was empty and could not be used to fight the flames.

The situation worsens on the Japeri branch, which had 323 occurrences and  cables taken, especially in the regions of Japeri, Queimados and Nova Iguaçu. This means a cost of R$1.5 million with the replacement of this material, this year alone. According to SuperVia, the biggest loss, is for customers, since from January to October more than 1,102 trips were canceled or interrupted. To mitigate actions of this type, the company made adjustments in the installation of cables that result in a cost three times higher than the traditional model.

Judicial Recovery 

The company will keep its activities even with the request for recovery.

The company, as well as the entire passenger system in Rio de Janeiro, does not have any government subsidy and basically supports itself with funds from ticket sales. With the worsening of the pandemic and the economic crisis, the full recovery of the flow of passengers is expected for 2023, according to company figures.

The company is controlled by Guarana Urban Mobility Incorporated Brasil (GUMI), a consortium formed by the Japanese Mitsui and West Japan Railway Company, in addition to JOIN, a Japanese fund.

See also 
 Rio de Janeiro Light Rail
 Santa Teresa Tram

References

External links

Official Page
Stations Map 
Rio de Janeiro Government 
SuperVia Map 
Rio de Janeiro Stations

 
BRT (Rio de Janeiro)
Railway companies of Brazil
Railway companies established in 1998
5 ft 3 in gauge railways in Brazil
Electric railways in Brazil
Brazilian politicians convicted of crimes
Corruption in Brazil
Politicians convicted of corruption